The version history of the Ford Power-Up updates for the Ford SYNC Version 4 and 4a hardware developed by Ford Motor Company began with the release of the 2021 Mustang Mach-E in December 2020. This was simply referred to as over-the-air updates until May 2021 when Ford adopted the "Ford Power-Up" name.

Overview 
The Ford Power-Up updates have the ability to upgrade the user interface as well as reprogram module firmware within the vehicle. Ford expects to produce 33 million vehicles with Power-Up capability by 2028. Not all vehicles have the same software layout due to the differences in the user interfaces. SYNC 4 comes with an 8 or 12 inch horizontally oriented main display while SYNC 4a comes with a 12 or 15.5 inch vertically oriented main display.

Future features 
Ford has publicly discussed enhancements for future Power-Up updates. The precise timing and grouping of these updates has not been announced. These features may be released across several versions, and some or all of these features may not be released for certain vehicles, model years, or at all.

These future features include:

BlueCruise updates
Lane Change Assist (change lanes with a tap of the turn signal)
 Predictive Speed Assist (adjust vehicle speed for road curves, roundabouts and more) 
 In-Lane Repositioning (helps hands-free highway driving feel more natural by keeping the vehicle in its lane while subtly shifting its position away from vehicles in adjacent lanes, especially large semi trucks)
 Touchscreen Games
 “Escape Room”
 Add a “Pet Mode”
 Add software controlled front trunk release button (for vehicles not shipped with it enabled)
 Unlock 2021 model Mustang Mach-E usable battery to the same level as 2022 models (from 68 to 70 kWh and from 88 to 91 kWh)

Versions 
The following table summarizes the release history for the Ford SYNC Version 4 and 4a Power-Up software updates.

References

Ford Motor Company